Joey Worthen (born December 3, 1979 in Salt Lake City, Utah) is a former American soccer player and the current head coach of the Florida Atlantic Owls men's soccer program.

Career

College and amateur
Worthen attended Cottonwood High School where he was named to the Parade High School All-America soccer team in 1998. He played college soccer at the University of South Carolina in 1998, but after his freshman season he withdrew from school to play for the United States U-20 men's national soccer team. He returned to South Carolina in 1999 and continued until his senior season in 2001, finishing his career with 24 goals and 15 assists.

Worthen also played with the Cape Cod Crusaders in the USL Premier Development League in 2000.

Professional
Worthern turned professional and was drafted in the second round of the A-League College Draft by the Pittsburgh Riverhounds. In his first season in Pittsburgh he appeared in all 28 games and was named the Riverhounds' Rookie of the Year after leading the team in assists, minutes played, games played, and games started. He transferred to the Richmond Kickers in 2004, and spent the next two seasons there, before being offered a contract with Real Salt Lake of Major League Soccer in March 2006.

On April 11, 2007 Worthen signed with the expansion Carolina RailHawks of USL First Division.

On February 17, 2009, Worthen announced his return to the Kickers., and was part of the Kickers team which won the 2009 USL Second Division championship.

He transferred to the Austin Aztex just days before the start of the 2010 USSF Division 2 Professional League season.

International
Worthen played for the United States U-20 men's national soccer team in 1999, but has never been called into the senior team.

Coaching career 
From 2012–2016, Worthen was an assistant coach for the South Carolina Gamecocks men's soccer program. On February 14, 2017, Worthen was named the head coach of the Florida Atlantic Owls men's soccer team ahead of the 2017 NCAA Division I men's soccer season.

Honors

Richmond Kickers
USL Second Division Champions (1): 2009

References

External links
Richmond Kickers bio
MLS player profile

1979 births
Living people
American soccer players
Cape Cod Crusaders players
Major League Soccer players
Real Salt Lake players
USL First Division players
USL Second Division players
Pittsburgh Riverhounds SC players
Richmond Kickers players
North Carolina FC players
Austin Aztex FC players
South Carolina Gamecocks men's soccer players
Sportspeople from Salt Lake City
USSF Division 2 Professional League players
USL League Two players
A-League (1995–2004) players
United States men's under-20 international soccer players
Soccer players from Salt Lake City
Association football defenders
South Carolina Gamecocks men's soccer coaches
Florida Atlantic Owls men's soccer coaches
American soccer coaches
Cottonwood High School (Murray, Utah) alumni